Louis Ernest Sola (born January 8, 1968) is an American businessman and politician, who is currently Commissioner of the Federal Maritime Commission. Sola currently works under Chairman Daniel B. Maffei and alongside Commissioners Rebecca F. Dye and Carl Bentzel.

On November 15, 2018, Sola was nominated to the Federal Maritime Commission by President Donald Trump and was confirmed by the United States Senate on January 2, 2019.  He was sworn into office on January 23, 2019, during the government shutdown for a 5-year term expiring June 30, 2023.

Sola was distinguished by the Panama Canal with the "Esteemed Order of Bearers of the Master Key" and appointed an "Honorary Lead Pilot". In addition, he was bestowed Seatrade Cruise Man of the Year for his work supporting seafarers during the Covid 19 pandemic.  Sola previously served as a Florida State Commissioner on the Board of Harbor Pilots where he chaired the probable cause panel for maritime incidents.

Early life and education 
L. E. Sola was born in Chicago, IL, and was raised in Goodland, Indiana, and the Panama Canal Zone. He received an A.A. in History from Parkland College in 1989; a B.S. in Management from the Nova Southeastern University in 1996; and a M.S. in International Finance from the University of Illinois in 1998. He is a two-time graduate (in Spanish and German) of the Defense Language Institute, Foreign Language Center, located at the Presidio of Monterey, CA.

Early career 
Sola served on the Florida Board of Pilots Commissioners where he was responsible for licensing and regulating harbor pilots. He also served on the probable cause panel for maritime incidents. Previously, he was a Sales Executive with Camper & Nicholsons (Fincantieri), Northrop Grumman, and Azimut Benetti. He is a licensed International Ship and Yacht Broker who has constructed over 125 new yachts and ships and is the founder of Evermarine, a Miami based mega yacht brokerage company. Additionally, he served as an Adjunct Professor at Florida State University.

Sola also worked as a consultant for the Inter-American Development Bank during the United States handover of the Panama Canal.

Military career 
Sola served as a Strategic Debriefer for the United States Army Intelligence and Security Command in Munich, Germany after the fall of the Berlin Wall by strategically debriefing refugees from Eastern Europe. Subsequently, he served in Counterintelligence and Counter Narcotics missions in Panama with the United States Southern Command, commanded by future Drug Czar General Barry McCaffrey, during the War on Drugs and the fall of Pablo Escobar. Sola earned the US Army Parachutist Badge (Airborne) and was awarded the Humanitarian Service Medal for his efforts during the 1994 Cuban rafter crisis. His accounts of the resilience of the Cuban people where latter recounted in the Financial Times.

Politics 
Both candidates were removed from the ballot which was cited as a factor that led to the 2018 U.S. Florida Senate election recount. Sola has publicly stated he will not run for Florida's 26th congressional district in 2020.

Federal Maritime Commission 
On April 30, 2020, the Federal Maritime Commission appointed Commissioner Sola to lead "Fact Finding 30," a federal fact-finding investigation on the impacts of COVID-19 on the cruise industry. This investigation focused on cruise line performance, ticket refund policy, and the economic impacts of the CDC No Sail Order. Sola recommended an "urgent need for ships to start sailing again" due to the economic impacts on the nation's ports, local governments, and small businesses.

On March 25, 2021, Sola published his cruise-forward plan for resumption of cruising focusing upon shore side, crew and passenger vaccinations, while at the same time calling on President Biden to donate vaccines with Caribbean and Central American cruise ports.  Due to the Canadian ban on cruise ships through 2022,  Sola called for modification of the Passenger Vessel Services Act of 1886 that require cruise ships to stop at a foreign port before calling again on a US port, that eventually became the Alaska Tourism Act.  Sola also proposed federal consumer protection rule changes to standardize refund practices in the cruise industry in order to protect passengers from cancellations.  In an interview with CNBC concerning cruise line mandates for passengers to have Covid-19 vaccinations before boarding, Sola stated, “I feel much safer on a cruise ship than I do flying."  Commissioner Sola dedicated his Seatrade Outstanding Achievement Award to seafarers and crew members, saying 'Without them, we wouldn't be here.'

See also 
 Michael A. Khouri
 Daniel B. Maffei
 Rebecca F. Dye
 United States Federal Maritime Board

References 

1968 births
University of Illinois alumni
Federal Maritime Commission members
Living people
Florida Republicans
People from Chicago
Politicians from Miami
21st-century American politicians
American people of Spanish-Jewish descent
American people of Italian descent
Hispanic and Latino American people
American people of Spanish descent
Spanish Jews
People from Miami-Dade County, Florida
Military personnel from Florida
Zonians
Defense Language Institute alumni
Trump administration personnel